First Offence is the debut album of London-based 'wildstyle' band King Prawn. It was released in 1995, and also re-released in 2001.

Track listing
"Doledrums"
"Salvation" 
"Boxed & Packaged"
"Immigrant Song Too"
"Restart (Acts I & II)"
"Bossman's Bleeding"
"Nobody Like You"
"Alien Spawn"
"First Defence"

Re-released track listing
"Immigrant Song Too"
"First Defence"
"Boxed & Packaged"
"Bossman's Bleeding"
"Restart" (Acts I & II)
"Doledrums"
"Nobody Like You"
"Salvation"
"Alien Spawn"
"Poison in the Air" (Alternative Mix)
"Divine Badness" (Alternative Mix)
"Holy War" (Live Studio Recording)
"Winning Again" (Live Studio Recording)
"Buried Alive" (Demo Recording)
"Poison in the Air" (Enhanced Video)

External links
myspace.com/originalkingprawn
Golf Records profile of King Prawn
King Prawn interview

1995 debut albums
King Prawn (band) albums